Harold Thomas Henry "Boake" Carter (28 September 1903 – 16 November 1944) was a British-American broadcast news commentator in the 1930s and early 1940s.

Early life

He was born in Baku, Russian Empire (now the capital of Azerbaijan), the son of British parents Thomas Carter and Edith Harwood-Yarred, from London and Leicestershire, respectively. His father worked for a British oil company. Carter would later claim his father had been in the British Consular Service (his father was the British Honorary Consul). Carter grew up in the United Kingdom, and enlisted in the Royal Air Force at the age of 15, serving with the RAF's Coast Patrol for eighteen months. He attended Tonbridge School from 1918 to 1921, and would later claim to have attended Christ's College in Cambridge. He arrived in the United States on September 25, 1921, after his father was assigned to Mexico.

Career
Carter worked at the Philadelphia Daily News as a journalist. He entered broadcasting as a news commentator with WCAU in Philadelphia in 1930, initially as the announcer for a rugby game, getting the job by default as he was the only person WCAU's director knew who was familiar with the sport. In 1931, he became the narrator for Hearst-Metrotone newsreels. He rose to fame as a broadcast journalist when he covered the Lindbergh kidnapping trial, beginning in 1932. He continued to work for WCAU, with his broadcasts distributed through the CBS network.

After achieving fame, he was a familiar radio voice, but his commentaries were controversial, notably his criticisms of Franklin D. Roosevelt's New Deal and the powerful Congress of Industrial Organizations. Carter was an accomplished salesman for the sponsor of his program from 1933 to 1938, Philco Radios, blending his reporting and commentary with plugs for the company's sets. He became a naturalized U.S. citizen in 1934.

In 1936, he had more listeners than any other radio commentator. He also appeared in a Life magazine advertisement for Lucky Strike cigarettes.  He published several books in the 1930s, and began writing a widely syndicated column (for the Ledger Syndicate) in 1937. But by 1937, the Roosevelt White House already had three federal agencies investigating him. In 1938, under pressure from Roosevelt's allies, he lost his WCAU job, was barred from CBS, and lost his General Foods sponsorship that had replaced Philco. With his removal, there was no longer any popular radio commentator who opposed Roosevelt's foreign policy.

That year, Carter went on a speaking tour throughout the States. In 1939, he returned to radio with a thrice-weekly evening commentary on the Mutual Broadcasting System, adopting a pro-Roosevelt stance. Mutual gradually moved his broadcasts to less prominent time slots.

A newspaper article by Carter, published in the Cleveland News on March 25, 1939, claimed that "responsible statesmen of the world do not expect the recent events in Europe [e.g., the annexation of Austria and the Sudetenland by Nazi Germany] of themselves will produce a general European war .... despite all the scare headlines in America from day to day."  He may have been right about those statesmen's expectations, but he (and they) were horribly wrong.

In the early 1940s, Carter was drawn into a "British Israelite" cult led by a Moses Guibbory. He legally changed his name to Ephraim Boake Carter prior to his death.

Death
Carter was almost a forgotten figure when he died of a heart attack in 1944 in Hollywood. A messy fight between his three former wives followed over his estate. Stewart Robb's The Strange Death of Boake Carter, published in 1946, suggested Boake was murdered, perhaps by Guibbory. In 1949, his final years were documented in a book, Thirty-Three Candles, by fellow cult adherent David Horowitz.

References

Listen to
Boake Carter

1903 births
1944 deaths
American broadcast news analysts
American radio journalists
People educated at Tonbridge School
British emigrants to the United States
Old Right (United States)
British Israelism
British expatriates in the Russian Empire